Reference and User Services Quarterly is a peer-reviewed academic journal covering library science. It is the official journal of the Reference and User Services Association and is published by the American Library Association. The journal was established as the Reference Quarterly in 1961  and obtained its current name in 1997.

Reference and User Services Quarterly is available electronically via EBSCO, Academic OneFile, and WilsonWeb, as well as on its own website.

References

External links 
 

Quarterly journals
Publications established in 1961
Library science journals
English-language journals